XHLZ-FM is a radio station in Lázaro Cárdenas, Michoacán. Broadcasting on 93.9 FM, XHLZ is owned by Medios Radiofónicos Michoacán and carries a grupera format known as La Pura Ley.

History
Guillermina Hernández Corona received the concession for XHLZ in 1983.

References

Radio stations in Michoacán